No. 25 Group RAF is a former Royal Air Force group.

 November 1939
HQ at RAF Brize Norton
 RAF Manby = No. 1 Air Armament School RAF
 RAF Pembrey = No. 2 Air Armament School RAF
 RAF Aldergrove = No. 3 Air Observers School RAF
 RAF West Freugh = No. 4 Air Observers School RAF
 RAF Jurby = No. 5 Air Observers School RAF
 RAF Porthcawl = No. 7 Air Observers School RAF
 RAF Evanton = No. 8 Air Observers School RAF
 RAF Penrhos = No. 9 Air Observers School RAF
 RAF Warmwell = No. 10 Air Observers School RAF
 May 1941
HQ at RAF Market Drayton
 RAF Dumfries = No. 10 Bombing and Gunnery School RAF
 RAF Evanton = No. 8 Bombing and Gunnery School RAF
 RAF Exeter = Gunnery Research Unit RAF & Det of Royal Aircraft Establishment
 RAF Jurby = No. 5 Bombing and Gunnery School RAF
 RAF Manby = No. 1 Air Armament School RAF
 RAF Millom = No. 2 Bombing and Gunnery School RAF
 RAF Penrhos = No. 9 Bombing and Gunnery School RAF
 RAF Stormy Down = No. 7 Bombing and Gunnery School RAF
 RAF Warmwell = Central Gunnery School RAF
 RAF West Freugh = No. 4 Bombing and Gunnery School RAF
 April 1942
HQ at Market Drayton
 RAF Barrow = No. 10 Air Gunners School RAF
 RAF Bobbington = No. 3 Air Observers School RAF
 RAF Chelveston = Central Gunnery School RAF
 RAF Dalcross = No. 2 Air Gunners School RAF
 RAF Dumfries = No. 10 Air Observers School RAF
 RAF Evanton = No. 8 Air Gunnery School RAF
 RAF Exeter = Gunnery Research School RAF
 RAF Jurby = No. 5 Air Observers School RAF
 RAF Llandwrog = No. 9 Air Gunners School RAF
 RAF Manby = No. 1 Air Armament School RAF
 RAF Millom = No. 2 Air Observers School RAF
 RAF Pembrey = No. 1 Air Gunners School RAF
 RAF Penrhos = No. 9  Air Observers School RAF
 RAF Stormy Down = No. 7 Air Gunners School RAF
 RAF West Freugh = No. 4 Air Observers School RAF
 RAF Wigtown = No. 1  Air Observers School RAF
 April 1943
HQ at Market Drayton
 RAF Bobbington = No. 3 (Observers) Advanced Flying Unit RAF
 RAF Cranage = Central Navigation School RAF
 RAF Exeter = Gunnery Research Unit RAF
 RAF Manby = No. 1 Air Armament School RAF
 RAF Mona = No. 3 Air Gunners School RAF
 RAF Pembrey = No. 1 Air Gunners School RAF
 RAF Penrhos = No. 9 (Observers) Advanced Flying Unit RAF
 RAF Staverton = No. 6 Air Observers School RAF
 RAF Stormy Down = No. 7 Air Gunners School RAF
 RAF Sutton Bridge = Central Gunnery School RAF
 July 1944
HQ at Market Drayton
 RAF Barrow = No. 10 Air Gunners School RAF
 RAF Blackpool = School of Air Sea Rescue RAF
 RAF Cark = Staff Pilots Training Unit RAF
 RAF Catfoss = Central Gunnery School RAF
 RAF Halfpenny Green = No. 3 (Observers) Advanced Flying Unit RAF & No. 1545 (Beam Approach Training) Flight RAF
 RAF Manby = No. 1 Air Armament School RAF
 RAF Millom = No. 2 (Observers) Advanced Flying Unit RAF
 RAF Mona = No. 8 (Observers) Advanced Flying Unit RAF
 RAF Pembrey = No. 8 (Observers) Advanced Flying Unit RAF & No. 1 Air Gunners School RAF
 RAF Penrhos = No. 9 (Observers) Advanced Flying Unit RAF
 RAF Staverton = No. 6 (Observers) Advanced Flying Unit RAF
 RAF Stormy Down = No. 7 Air Gunners School RAF
 July 1945
HQ at Market Drayton
 RAF Barrow = No. 10 Air Gunners School RAF
 RAF Cark = Staff Pilots Training Unit RAF
 RAF Catfoss = Central Gunnery School RAF
 RAF Halfpenny Green = No. 3 (Observers) Advanced Flying Unit RAF
 RAF Manby = Empire Air Armament School RAF
 RAF Penrhos = No. 2 Air Crew Holding Unit RAF
 RAF Shawbury = Empire Air Navigation School RAF
April 1962
HQ at RAF White Waltham
 Brough Aerodrome = Hull University Air Squadron
 Cambridge City Airport = Cambridge University Air Squadron
 Aberdeen Airport (Dyce) = Aberdeen University Air Squadron
 RAF Exeter = No. 3/4 Civilian Anti-Aircraft Co-operation Unit RAF
 RAF Hullavington = No. 2 Air Navigation School RAF
 RAF Leuchars = St Andrews University Air Squadron
 Perth Airport = Glasgow University Air Squadron
 RAF Shawbury = Birmingham University Air Squadron
 RAF South Cerney = No. 1 Initial Training School RAF
 RAF Stradishall = No. 1 Air Navigation School RAF
 RAF Sydenham = Queens University Air Squadron
 RAF Topcliffe = No. 1 Air Electronics School RAF
 Edinburgh Airport (Turnhouse) = Edinburgh University Air Squadron
 RAF White Waltham = London University Air Squadron

References

Citations

Bibliography

 

025
Training units and formations of the Royal Air Force